Charia is a small town located about five kilometres west of Wa, the capital of the Upper West Region of Ghana. It has about ten thousand inhabitants. The population comprises a mix of Christians, Muslims and Traditionalists. The major economic activities of the town are; farming, pottery, commerce. Since the country attained independence in 1957, the town has produced two District Commissioners for the Wa District (one in the Kwame Nkrumah Regime and another during the John Evans Atta Mills presidency). It has also produced a Deputy Minister under the John Agyekum Kufour administration.

Populated places in the Upper West Region